The Norfolk State Spartans women's basketball team represents Norfolk State University, located in Norfolk, Virginia, in NCAA Division I basketball competition. They currently compete in the Mid-Eastern Athletic Conference.

History
Norfolk State began play in 1974. They competed in the Central Intercollegiate Athletic Association (CIAA) from 1974 to 1997 before joining Division I and the MEAC in 1997. In their time in Division II, they were champions of the CIAA Tournament in 1975, 1977, 1983, 1986, 1991, 1992, 1993, 1995, and 1996, while competing in eight NCAA Division II Tournaments (1982, 1983, 1986, 1991, 1992, 1993, 1994, 1995), reaching the Final Four in 1991.

Postseason

NCAA Division I Tournament results

NCAA Division II tournament results
The Spartans made eight appearances in the NCAA Division II women's basketball tournament. They had a combined record of 9–9.

References

External links